Ruti may refer to:

As a given name

 Ruti Olajugbagbe, winner of series seven of The Voice UK
 Ruti Sela, Israeli video artist
 Ruti Zisser, Israeli American lifestyle designer, fashion designer, wardrobe stylist, and businesswoman

As a surname

 Mari Ruti, Distinguished Professor of critical theory and of gender and sexuality studies at the University of Toronto

Other uses

 Aker (god), the Egyptian god of the horizon
 Ruti (crater), a crater on Ganymede
 Rüti (disambiguation), a number of places in Switzerland
 Ruti, an alternative spelling of roti, an unleavened flatbread
 Ruti, a 1998 Bangladesh film